Oiliver Akowuah Owusu Hayford (born 25 October 1981) is a former professional footballer from Ghana. He last plays for Nakhon Pathom in the Thailand Premier League.

Personal life 
Owusu is the son of former footballer and coach Bashir Hayford (father) and the late Nusrat Owusu Hayford (mother), who died in June 2008.

References

Living people
Ghanaian footballers
1981 births
Expatriate footballers in Thailand
Medeama SC players
Association football midfielders